Minami Yoda is an American mechanical engineer and a professor of mechanical engineering at Georgia Tech. Her research concerns experimental fluid dynamics, with applications ranging from fusion power to nanofluidics, and including the measurement of fluid flows using the evanescent field.

Education and career
Yoda graduated from the California Institute of Technology in 1985, and completed her Ph.D. at Stanford University in 1989. Her dissertation, The instantaneous concentration field in the self-similar region of a high Schmidt number round jet, was supervised by Lambertus Hesselink.

After postdoctoral research at the Technical University of Berlin, she joined the Georgia Tech faculty in 1995. At Georgia Tech, she is the principal investigator of the Fluids, Optical and Interfacial Diagnostics Lab. She served as chair of the American Physical Society Division of Fluid Dynamics for 2019–2020.

Recognition
Yoda was named a Fellow of the American Society of Mechanical Engineers in 2008. She became a Fellow of the American Physical Society (APS) in 2012, after being nominated by the APS Division of Fluid Dynamics, "for outstanding contributions to experimental fluid dynamics and optical diagnostics and, specifically, for innovative contributions to the development of evanescent-wave illumination techniques to study flows in near-wall regions".

References

External links

Year of birth missing (living people)
Living people
Georgia Tech faculty
American mechanical engineers
American women engineers
California Institute of Technology alumni
Fellows of the American Society of Mechanical Engineers
Fellows of the American Physical Society
Stanford University alumni
American women academics
21st-century American women